Ari Olavi Tissari (born 24 November 1951) is a Finnish footballer. He competed in the men's tournament at the 1980 Summer Olympics.

References

External links
 

1951 births
Living people
Finnish footballers
Association football forwards
Kotkan Työväen Palloilijat players
Vasalunds IF players
Finland international footballers
Olympic footballers of Finland
Footballers at the 1980 Summer Olympics
Finnish expatriate sportspeople in Sweden
Expatriate footballers in Sweden
People from Kotka
Sportspeople from Kymenlaakso